Qbit may refer to:
Quettabit, the symbol for the decimal unit of information storage
qBittorrent
Qubit, a quantum bit, or qubit (sometimes qbit) is a unit of quantum information
Cubit, an ancient measure of length
Q-Bit (born 1978), alias of American electronic musician Benn Jordan